Sharag (also Romanized as Shārag; also known as Qal‘eh-ye Shārak and Shārak) is a village in Talang Rural District, Talang District, Qasr-e Qand County, Sistan and Baluchestan Province, Iran. At the 2006 census, its population was 1,058, in 218 families.

References 

Populated places in Qasr-e Qand County